Worst Woman is a 2016 South Korean romance melodrama film starring Han Ye-ri, Ryo Iwase, Lee Hee-joon and Kwon Yul. A feature debut by Kim Jong-kwan, it depicts the romantic encounters of a young woman and three different men she meets in a day. It made its debut at the 17th Jeonju International Film Festival and received the FIRESCI Award at the 38th Moscow International Film Festival in 2016.

Plot 
Eun-hee (Han Ye-ri) is an actress with poor acting skills. However, in real life, she likes to create different personas each time she meets a different man. Eventually all her lies get tangled up when she happens to meet three men in one day.

Cast
 Han Ye-ri as Eun-hee
 Ryo Iwase as Ryohei
 Lee Hee-joon as Woon-chul (Special appearance)
 Kwon Yul as Hyun-oh
 Kim Joon-beom as Gyoo-hwan
 Lee Seung-yeon as Yoo-jin 
 Choi Yu-hwa as Hyun-kyung

Awards and nominations

References

External links 
 
 
 

2016 films
2010s Korean-language films
South Korean romantic drama films
Films directed by Kim Jong-kwan
2010s South Korean films